Henry B. Laufer (born 1945) is an American mathematician, investor and philanthropist. He served as the Vice President of Research at Renaissance Technologies.

Early life
Henry B. Laufer was born to a Jewish family in 1945. He received his PhD from Princeton University in 1965, studying with Robert Gunning.

Career
Laufer joined the mathematics department at the State University of New York at Stony Brook as a faculty member in 1971.  His research focused on complex variables and algebraic topology. He left Stony Brook in 1992 to join Renaissance Technologies. In 2015, a conference was held for his 70th anniversary at Tsinghua University in China.

Laufer co-founded the Medallion Fund with Jim Simons in 1988. Laufer served as chief scientist and vice president of research at Renaissance Technologies, its parent company. He now serves on its board of directors.

Laufer earned US$125,000,000 in 2008, during the financial crisis of 2007–2008. The following year, in 2009, he was named one of "Wall Street's Highest Earners" by Forbes, with an income of US$390,000,000.

Philanthropy and political contributions
Laufer  and his wife enabled the foundation of the Louis and Beatrice Laufer Center for Physical and Quantitative Biology at Stony Brook University with a donation in 2008.

Laufer donated US$500,000 to Correct the Record, a political action committee which supported Hillary Clinton's 2016 presidential campaign, in February 2016. Meanwhile, in April 2016, Laufer and his wife organized a US$500-ticket fundraiser for Clinton in Florida.

Personal life
Laufer is married to Dr. Marsha Zlatin Laufer, a speech-language pathologist, philanthropist and political activist. She served as the chairwoman of the Democratic Party for the town of Brookhaven, New York from 2001 to 2009. The couple resides in Manalapan, Florida. They have 3 children.

Selected bibliography

References

External links

Living people
1940s births
People from Setauket, New York
People from Palm Beach County, Florida
Princeton University alumni
Stony Brook University faculty
20th-century American mathematicians
American hedge fund managers
Philanthropists from New York (state)
Jewish American philanthropists
American billionaires
Mathematicians from New York (state)
21st-century American mathematicians
21st-century American Jews